WLZD-LP (106.1 FM) is an American low-power FM radio station licensed to Hazard, Kentucky. The station is currently owned by Hazard Community Broadcasting.

Notable Former On-Air Staff

References

External links
 

LZD-LP
LZD-LP
Hazard, Kentucky